This is a list of Indian dishes. Many of the dishes on this list are made all across India. Indian cuisine encompasses a wide variety of regional cuisine native to India. Given the range of diversity in soil type, climate and occupations, these cuisines vary significantly from each other and use locally available ingredients such as: herbs, vegetables and fruits. The dishes are then served according to taste in either mild, medium or hot. Indian food is also heavily influenced by religious and cultural choices, like Hinduism and traditions. Some Indian dishes are common in more than one region of India, with many vegetarian and vegan dishes. Some ingredients commonly found in Indian dishes include: rice, wheat, ginger, garlic, green chillies and spices.

North-East India
The North-East of India includes Assam, Manipur, Meghalaya, Mizoram, Nagaland, Sikkim, Tripura and Arunachal Pradesh.

North India

South India

West India

East India

Unsorted
 Bread pakora
 Dhoper chop
 Karela nu shak

See also

 List of Indian breads
 List of Indian drinks
 List of Indian pickles
 List of Indian snacks
 List of Indian soups and stews
 List of Indian sweets and desserts
 Mutton curry
 Sattvic Diet
 Lacto vegetarianism

References

Dishes

Lists of foods by nationality